Lourdes del Valle Valera Galvis (15 June 1963 - 2 May 2012) was a Venezuelan actress who took part in over twenty film and television productions during her career, particularly known for her acting in many telenovelas.

Career
Valera first took part in theater at age ten with her primary school's theater group. In 1979, at sixteen years old, she made her television debut on the RCTV program Radio Rochela, where she developed her comedy skills as a comedian. She also was on the program Niño de papel. In 1983, Valera was cast in her first telenovela, the Venezuelan soap opera Leonela.

In addition to her acting, her mother insisted that Valera complete her education, and she graduated with a degree in social communication from the Central University of Venezuela.

In 1985, Valera started a role in the soap opera Cristal, and then continued to act in many other soap operas throughout her career, including La vida entera, Ciudad Bendita, Se solicita príncipe azul, Cosita rica, Las González, Guerra de mujeres, Amantes de luna llena, Enséñame a querer, El país de las mujeres, Contra viento y marea, La llaman Mariamor, Cruz de nadie, Las dos Dianas, Señora, and Topacio.

Personal life
In 1993, Valera married film director Luis Alberto Lamata, whom she met in 1984. The couple never had children. In 2008, after examinations for possible cosmetic surgery, she was diagnosed with lung cancer, from which she temporarily recovered. A relapse in 2011 caused her death on May 2, 2012.

Filmography

Television
 El árbol de Gabriel (2011) - Bárbara Miranda
 La vida entera (2008) - Rosa Coronel
 Ciudad Bendita (2006) - Francisca "Ñinguita"/"Burusa
 Se solicita príncipe azul (2005) - Miriam Rondón
 Cosita rica (2003) - "La Chata"
 Las González (2002) - Bromelia
 Guerra de mujeres (2001) - Dolores "Lolita"
 Amantes de luna llena (2000) - Guadalupe "Lupita" Madera
 Enséñame a querer (1998) - Matea
 El país de las mujeres (1998) - Chiqui Gallardo Gómez
 Contra viento y marea (1997) - "La Zurda"
 La llaman Mariamor (1996) - Francesca
 Cruz de nadie (1994)
 El paseo de la gracia de Dios (1993) - Emma
 Divina obsesión (1992) - Amelia
 Las dos Dianas (1992) - Rosa "Rosita"
 La traidora (1991) - Sofía
 Señora (1988) - Zoraida
 Cristal (1985) - Zoraida "Cerebrito"
 Topacio (1984) - Violeta
 Leonela (1983)

Films
 Cuidado con lo que sueñas (2012) - de Geyka Urdaneta
 Patas arriba (2011) - Monserrat
 Taita Boves (2010) 
 El enemigo (2008) - Antonieta Sánchez
 13 segundos (2007) - Mercedes
 Rosa de Francia (1995)
 Desnudo con naranjas (1994) - Margarita

Theater
 Sólo dementes
 Toc Toc
 A 2.50 la Cuba libre
 Confesiones de mujeres de 30
 Brujas

References

External links
 

1963 births
2012 deaths
Actresses from Caracas
Venezuelan telenovela actresses
Venezuelan film actresses
Venezuelan stage actresses
Central University of Venezuela alumni
Deaths from lung cancer